Khas Kunar or Sarkani(sarkano) District is the largest district in the Kunar Province, Afghanistan. It is situated in the southern part of the province and borders Nangarhar Province to the south and Pakistan to the east. The Kunar River passes north through the district and irrigates the surrounding land. The population was estimated to be 31,000 in 2006. Most of the houses were destroyed during the wars and droughts also have seriously affected the lands all around the Kunar River. The most influential person from this district was Kabir Stori, who was a Pashtun nationalist.

Villages of Khas Kunar
 تنر Tannar
 ارازۍ Araz
بره ارازۍ Bara Arazi
 حکیم اباد hakim abad (koligram کولیګرام) 
 خیبر خوړ Khyber khowar
 Chara gai
. کیمپCamp
.میاګانو کلیMiagano Kelai
 زرګرانZargaran
 لوټانLottan
 شالۍShalai
 منګوالmangwal
 چنچChanch
 بیلام bilam
کوټکی kotki( kotkai)
چیماریchemyari
زوړ کونړ Zor kunar
خاص کونړ khas kunar
کنډرو غاړه kadro kaly
بانډه bandaei
ملکانو بانډه malkano banda
طلایی بانډې telay banda
سری saray
بر سری bar saray
شیخانو بانډه shikhano banda
صحابزاده ګانو کلی sahib zad gano kaly
ډاک کلی dag kaly
لوی کلی loy kaly
اهینګرانو کلی ahingrano kaly
باراباد barabad
شامکار Shankar
ولۍ wolaei

External links
UNHCR District Profile
District Map of Khas Kunar

Districts of Kunar Province